Luiz Jeferson Escher (born 28 June 1987, in Alecrim)  is a Brazilian footballer, who currently plays for Moroccan side Kawkab Marrakech.

Personal life
This year his wife and daughter moved to Marrakech in Morocco.

References

1987 births
Living people
Brazilian footballers
Brazilian expatriate footballers
Expatriate footballers in Morocco
Brazilian expatriate sportspeople in Morocco
Brazilian people of Swiss descent
Wydad AC players
Kawkab Marrakech players
Maghreb de Fès players
Sportspeople from Rio Grande do Sul
Association football forwards